Katihar district is one of the thirty-eight districts of Bihar state in India, and Katihar city is the administrative headquarters of this district. The district is a part of Purnia Division.
It is prominently known for its Katihar Junction Railway Station, which is a Category A station on the Barauni–Guwahati line. It has been included in the Aspirational Districts Program of the Government of India since 2018, to improve its socio-economic indicators.

History
Katihar district is a part of the Mithila region. Mithila first gained prominence after being settled by Indo-Aryan peoples who established the Mithila Kingdom (also called Kingdom of the Videhas).

During the late Vedic period (c. 1100–500 BCE), Kingdom of the Videhas became one of the major political and cultural centers of South Asia, along with Kuru and Pañcāla. The kings of the Kingdom of the Videhas were called Janakas.
The Mithila Kingdom was later incorporated into the Vajjika League, which had its capital in the city of Vaishali, which is also in Mithila.

Later it was dominated by Chaudhary family who were the biggest landlords of Katihar district. Khan Bahadur Mohammad Baksh was the founder of the Chaudhary family. They held 15000 acres of land in Katihar district and 8500 acres of land in Purnia district. His great grandsons Chaudhary Mohammad Ashraf and Chaudhary Taj Mohammad live in a haveli known as Taj Dehori. Katihar became a district when it was split from Purnia in 1973.

Geography

Rivers: Mahananda, Ganges, Koshi, Righa

Katihar district is situated in the plains of North Eastern part of Bihar State, surrounded by Purnia district (Bihar) in the north and the west, Bhagalpur district (Bihar) and Sahebganj district (Jharkhand) in the south and Malda district and Uttar Dinajpur district (Paschim Bengal) in the east.

Politics 
  

|}

Economy
In 2006, the Ministry of Panchayati Raj named Katihar one of the country's 250 most backward districts (out of a total of 640). It is one of the 36 districts in Bihar currently receiving funds from the Backward Regions Grant Fund Programme (BRGF). It has also been included in the Aspirational Districts Program of the Government of India since 2018, to improve its socio-economic indicators.

The main source of economy in Katihar is agriculture, and most of its industries are agro-based. Rice is the main crop, while banana, jute and maize are the chief cash crops of the district. Makhana Phodi, an agro-industry where edible makhana (foxnuts) is produced from raw makhana, is a rapidly-rising industry in Katihar.

Katihar was once known as the "jute capital" of Bihar and boasted of two major jute mills, Sunbio Manufacturing Private Limited (also known as Old Jute Mill) and Rai Bahadur Hardutroy Motilal Chamria (RBHM) Jute Mill (also known as New Jute Mill).

 Old Jute Mill is spread over 35 acres of land, and is run by Govind Sharda backed Sunbio Manufacturing Private Limited. It was earlier run by the Bihar State Industrial Development Corporation (BSIDC), but was leased out in 2001. The present worker capacity (as of 2020) of the mill is around 200, with a daily production of around 10 tonnes, down from its peak of approximately 3000 and hundred tons.
 New Jute Mill is spread over 53.39 acres of land. It was started as a private mill in 1935 and first shut down in 1977. It was acquired by National Jute Manufacturers Corporation (NJMC) in 1980 and ran as a public sector undertaking till 2004, when it was closed again. It was restarted for a third time in the Public-Private Partnership (PPP) model in 2014. The mill closed its shutter in 2016, shortly after NJMC was shut following NITI Ayog recommendation in 2016, and has been shut since.

Political history
The district has seen immense activity during freedom struggle. There has been renowned freedom fighters like Alhaj Azhar Ali after whose name there is a village called Ajhrail. The busiest market square, Shaheed Chowk, has been named so in the memory of martyrs of 1942 Quit India Movement. Among notable freedom fighters from Katihar are, Dhrub Kundu, his father Dr Kishori Lal Kundu, Nakshtra Malakar (known as Robinhood of the Kosi belt).

The Katihar Lok Sabha constituency has been represented by politicians like Sitaram Kesri former Teasurer and President of AICC, Tariq Anwar, Nikhil Choudhary, Mohammad Yunus Saleem. Kashmiri veteran politician Mufti Mohammad Sayeed also unsuccessfully tried his luck in 1996 Lok Sabha elections.

Sub-divisions
Katihar District comprises 3 Sub-divisions:
Katihar
Barsoi
Manihari

Katihar sub-division is further divided into 10 blocks: Katihar, Korha, Falka, Sameli, Barari, Kursela, Pranpur, Hasanganj, Dandkhora and Mansahi. Barsoi sub-division consists 4 blocks: Barsoi, Kadwa, Azamnagar and Balrampur. Manihari sub-division has 2 blocks: Manihari and Amdabad.

Hasanganj being the largest block which was under Zamindari rule with acres of land under the possession of then Late Shri Jogendranarayan Roy Choudhury. The entire landmass with school, temple and market has been donated to the people from the predecessors who remain in Katihar now with little of the possession under the Paul Choudhury fame. Mansahi was also very active Zamindari estate which was at par with Kursela and Falka.

Villages
 

Dighari
Harnathpur

Demographics

According to the 2011 census, Katihar district has a population of 3,071,029, roughly equal to the nation of Oman or the US state of Iowa. This gives it a ranking of 117th in India (out of a total of 640). Its population growth rate over the decade 2001–2011 was 28.23%. Katihar has a sex ratio of 916 females for every 1000 males, and a literacy rate of 53.56%. 8.92% of the population lives in urban areas. Scheduled Castes and Scheduled Tribes make up 8.57% and 5.86% of the population respectively.

Religion

Hinduism is the majority religion, although in rural areas Hindus and Muslims are in equal numbers. In the eastern part of the district Muslims are in majority.

Languages

At the time of the 2011 Census of India, 25.86% of the population in the district spoke Surjapuri, 19.73% Hindi, 12.04% Bengali, 9.11% Urdu, 2.97% Santali and 2.29% Bhojpuri as their first language. 25.46% spoke languages recorded as 'Others' under Hindi on the census. Surjapuri speakers are largely concentrated in Kadwa, Azamnagar, Barsoi and Balrampur blocks bordering West Bengal, while Bengali is nearly in majority in Amdabad block.

References

External links 
 Official website
 Katihar Info.
 Katihar Information Portal
 Katihar Medical College

 
Purnia division
Districts of Bihar
Minority Concentrated Districts in India
1973 establishments in Bihar